The Trent River is a fresh water river of the coastal plain region of eastern North Carolina. Trenton and Pollocksville are small towns that lie along its course. The river measures  at its widest point and is fed by numerous fresh water branches and creeks along its length.

See also
List of rivers of North Carolina

References

 
Rivers of Craven County, North Carolina
Rivers of Jones County, North Carolina
Rivers of Lenoir County, North Carolina
Rivers of North Carolina
Tributaries of Pamlico Sound